Gobibatyr ustyuzhanini is a moth in the family Cossidae. It was described by Yakovlev in 2004. It is found in Mongolia.

References

Natural History Museum Lepidoptera generic names catalog

Cossinae
Moths described in 2004
Moths of Asia